Tom Keir Blyth (born 2 February 1995) is an English actor. His films include Scott and Sid (2018) and Benediction (2021). He stars as the titular character of the Epix series Billy the Kid (2022), and will star in The Hunger Games prequel, The Hunger Games: The Ballad of Songbirds and Snakes as President Coriolanus Snow.

Early life and education
Blyth was born in Birmingham and grew up in Woodthorpe, a suburb of Nottingham. He is the son of producer Gavin Blyth, who passed away when Tom was 15. Blyth attended Arnold Hill Academy and Bilborough College. His mother Charlotte, a careers counselor, signed him up for drama classes at the Television Workshop. He also joined the National Youth Theatre. He went on to train at the Juilliard School in New York City, as had been his dream, graduating in 2020.

Career
Blyth began his career with small supporting roles in the 2010 films Robin Hood and Pelican Blood. In 2018, Blyth starred opposite Richard Mason in the coming-of-age film Scott and Sid. Upon graduating from Juilliard, Blyth was cast as Glen Byam Shaw in the Terence Davies-directed biographical drama film Benediction, which premiered the following year. In 2022, he had a guest role in the HBO series The Gilded Age and started playing the titular character of the Epix series Billy the Kid. Blyth has upcoming film roles in the comedy Discussion Materials and The Hunger Games: The Ballad of Songbirds and Snakes, an adaptation of The Hunger Games prequel of the same name.

Filmography

Film

Television

References

External links

Tom Blyth at United Agents

Living people
1995 births
21st-century English male actors
Actors from Nottingham
Juilliard School alumni
Male actors from Birmingham, West Midlands
National Youth Theatre members
People from Gedling (district)